Candle Cove is an online  creepypasta horror story written by web cartoonist and author Kris Straub in 2009. The story centers on a fictional television series titled Candle Cove, that could only be viewed by a small group of people, predominantly children, who later recall the disturbing show on a web forum. Straub has stated that he was inspired to write the creepypasta after reading an article by the satirical news outlet The Onion titled Area 36-Year-Old Still Has Occasional Lidsville Nightmare.

Straub's story quickly became popular, inspiring numerous YouTube videos, and fan fictions. In 2015, Straub self-published Candle Cove in a collection of short stories entitled Candle Cove and Other Stories. The Verge commented that Candle Cove differed from other creepypastas in that while most creepypasta have an "anonymous folkloric quality", Candle Cove's originated from a known source and author.

The story was adapted for the first season of the Syfy anthology series Channel Zero, which aired in 2016. Additionally, Straub began the spin-off YouTube series Local 58 centered around strange broadcasts from the fictitious public access television channel where Candle Cove originally aired.

Synopsis
The story is told via a thread on a forum called the "NetNostalgia Forums", where a group of users discuss an unusual low-budget children's television show, Candle Cove, that they all remember watching on Channel Local 58 when they were children. The show is about a young girl named Janice, who imagines herself to be friends with pirates. The pirate characters are said to be portrayed by string marionettes.

As the users continue to reminisce they begin to recall more disturbing details about the show, such as a character known as the "Skin-Taker", a skeleton pirate who wears clothing made out of children's skin, and an episode that consisted entirely of the puppets flailing and screaming while Janice cries. It develops that there are no external records of the show's existence and that even those who say they remember seeing it have different memories of certain episodes. The story closes with a user stating that he recently asked his mother if she remembered the show. She responded that every time the user claimed "Candle Cove" was on, there was only static on the screen.

Television adaptation

 
In 2015 the SyFy Channel announced their intent to adapt the Candle Cove story as the first season of a newly-announced series, Channel Zero. The season, named after the creepypasta, expands on the story and centers on a child psychologist who has returned home in order to investigate the 1980s disappearances of his brother and other children. Channel Zero: Candle Cove stars Paul Schneider and Fiona Shaw, and premiered on October 11, 2016.

Reception
Will Wiles of Aeon wrote that Candle Cove was "among the best creepypastas out there" and a good example of using the messageboard and forum format as a storytelling tactic. The Verge has written praise for the creepypasta, stating that it was "a perfectly dark spin on our nostalgia for the half-remembered stories of our childhood, that realization that the things we liked as kids were much, much creepier than we thought."

References

External links
 Candle Cove at the author's website, Ichor Falls

2009 short stories
Fakelore
Fictional television shows
Horror fiction
Horror short stories
Internet memes introduced in 2009
Urban legends
Web fiction
Works adapted into television shows
Works by Kris Straub
Creepypasta